Myrtartona leucopleura is a species of moth in the family Zygaenidae. It is found in Queensland, New South Wales and the Australian Capital Territory.

The head, thorax and abdomen ground colour are dark brownish. The upperside of the forewings is dark grey-brown. The underside is slightly paler. The hindwing upperside is blackish grey, but paler proximally. The underside is similar but slightly paler. Females are similar to males but have narrower and more rounded wings. It is the only Australian Zygaenidae species with a bright white lateral line along the abdomen.

Adults have been reported exhibiting thanatosis when disturbed.

The larvae possibly feed on Leptospermum or Eucalyptus species.

References

Moths described in 1886
Endemic fauna of Australia
Procridinae